The 2019–20 season is Khan Research Laboratories Football Club's 24th competitive season, 23rd consecutive season in the top flight of Pakistani football, 13th consecutive season in the Premier League, and 24th year in existence as a football club.

Club

Coaching staff
{|class="wikitable"
|-
!Position
!Staff
|-
|Manager|| Ayaz Butt
|-
|Assistant Manager|| Saeed Sr.
|-
|Head Coach|| Aslam Khan
|-
|Assistant Coach|| Kamran Khan
|-
|Local Coach|| Muhammad Shahid
|-
|Goalkeeper Coach|| Muhammad Zeeshan
|-
|Scout|| Abdul Ghaffar
|-

Other information

First team squad

Season

National Challenge Cup

Khan Research Laboratories started their season with 3–0 win over Karachi United. On 24 July, they defeated Karachi Port Trust 5–0 and three days later drew 0–0 with WAPDA to top their group.

Table

Matches

Summary

Statistics

Appearances

Top scorers
The list is sorted by shirt number when total goals are equal.

Clean sheets
The list is sorted by shirt number when total clean sheets are equal.

References

2019–20 in Pakistani football